Tariq is an area of the Greater Amman Municipality, Jordan.
Population was 175,194  as of 2015.

References

External links
ammancity.gov.jo

Districts of Amman